The women's singles wheelchair tennis competition at the 2008 Summer Paralympics in Beijing was held from 8 September to 14 September at the Olympic Green Tennis Centre. The DecoTurf surface rendered the event a hardcourt competition.

Calendar

Seeds

Draw

Key

 INV = bipartite invitation
 IP = ITF place
 ALT = alternate

 r = retired
 w/o = walkover

Finals

Top half

Bottom half

References 
 
 

Women's singles
Para